The Shadow Secretary of State for Housing was a position in the United Kingdom's Shadow Cabinet that was created on 7 October 2016 by the Leader of the Opposition, Jeremy Corbyn during a cabinet reshuffle. This position succeeds the position of Shadow Minister for Housing and Planning, and shadowed the Minister of State for Housing at the Department for Levelling Up, Housing and Communities in Her Majesty's Government. The office was succeeded by the Shadow Secretary of State for Levelling Up, Housing and Communities.

List of Shadow Secretaries of State for Housing

Shadow Secretary of State for Housing's Team

Key

The current Shadow Housing team was updated on 11 May 2018, with Sarah Jones replacing Tony Lloyd after his appointment as Shadow Secretary of State for Northern Ireland.

See also
 Official Opposition frontbench

References

Official Opposition (United Kingdom)
Housing in the United Kingdom